Ali Mohammad Afghani (born 1 January 1925) is an Iranian writer. His father is from Tiran and Karvan, one of the counties of Isfahan province.

Biography
Veteran contemporary writer, Ali Mohammad Afghani was born on January 1, 1925, in Kermanshah. He was raised in a poor family. Although a top student, he dropped out of school to work alongside his father. He failed to get employment with the National Iranian Oil Company. He then decided to continue his education. After obtaining a high school diploma, he joined the armed forces and studied at the Military Academy. During that time, the country was experiencing political turmoil. He became a member of clandestine Officers organization of the Tudeh Party of Iran, comprising some of army officers. They were communist and opposed the then leader of Iran Mohammad Reza Pahlavi. On August 19, 1953, the nationalist government of Mohammad Mosaddeq was overturned through a Shah-backed coup d'état. Activities of the organization were disclosed after Zahedi swept to power, and Afghani was arrested along with a number of his colleagues. He was sentenced to life imprisonment, but he was released after five years due to a commutation.

Writing Career

Afghani wrote his masterpiece Madam Ahou's Husband while in prison and he himself published his masterpiece in 1961, because no publisher accepted to publish such a long novel written by an unknown writer, but after its publication many famous writers admired it. Literary figures such as the renowned translator Najaf Daryabandari and the prominent author Mohammad Ali Jamalzadeh praised his novel. The novel depicts the appalling life of Iranian women in that era.

Najaf Daryabandari once stated, "Looking into the life of the rabble, the author in this book pictures a painful tragedy. The scenes described in the book are reminiscent of masterpieces written by Leo Tolstoy and Honoré de Balzac. I have never had the same opinion about any other Persian books."

In March 1962, Mohammad-Ali Jamalzadeh, in a letter to a friend, wrote, "I received Madam Ahou’s Husband. I think fellow writers and I should kiss goodbye writing. Iran is a bizarre country. It nurtures talented youth in no time. What a wonderful book! Such descriptive images."

In 1965, Afghani published his second novel, Joyful People of Qarrasu Valley. The novel is about the love of a poor boy for the daughter of the village lord. It also depicts political currents of the post-1941 period.

Woven of Grief, Sindokht, and Cousin Parvin are some of his works he has done. His forthcoming books are Fathers’ World; Children’s World and a novel on the Iran-Iraq War.

Works and Publications
 
 
 Doctor Baktash 1989
 Sindokht
 ''Mahku ba A'dam'' 1993
 
 Turnip Is a Paradisal Fruit 
 
 Woven of Grief Cousin Parvin''

References

External References
 Ali Mohammad Afghani IMDb
 Afġāni, ʿAli Moḥammad: Šouhar-e Āhu-Ḫānom

Iranian writers
1925 births
Living people
People from Kermanshah
Iranian male short story writers